Khavaran is a neighborhood of Tehran metropolis, located in south-east Tehran, in municipal district No. 15.

See also
Khavaran cemetery

Neighbourhoods in Tehran